Bradley Phillip Tiley (born July 5, 1971) is a Canadian former professional ice hockey defenceman.

Playing career
Born in Markdale, Ontario, Tiley was drafted 84th overall by the Boston Bruins in the 1991 NHL Entry Draft. He played junior hockey with the Sault Ste. Marie Greyhounds of the Ontario Hockey League. Tiley played eleven NHL games, nine with the Phoenix Coyotes and two with the Philadelphia Flyers, scoring no points and no penalty minutes. He also played one playoff game for the Coyotes during the 1998–99 NHL season. Tiley finished his playing career with the Nippon Paper Cranes in Japan.

Coaching career 
On 17 July 2009 he signed a one-year contract with Owen Sound Attack as Assistant Coach and retired as an active player.

Personal 
Tiley lives with his wife Nikki and children Shea, Alex and Ella in Owen Sound, Ontario. His daughter, Shea Tiley captured back-to-back Frozen Four titles at the 2017 NCAA National Collegiate Women's Ice Hockey Tournament and 2018 NCAA National Collegiate Women's Ice Hockey Tournament.

Career statistics

References

External links
 

1971 births
Anaheim Bullfrogs players
Binghamton Rangers players
EHC Black Wings Linz players
Boston Bruins draft picks
Canadian ice hockey defencemen
Detroit Vipers players
Fort Wayne Komets players
Iserlohn Roosters players
Living people
Long Beach Ice Dogs (IHL) players
Maine Mariners players
Milwaukee Admirals players
Nippon Paper Cranes players
Orlando Solar Bears (IHL) players
People from Grey County
Philadelphia Flyers players
Philadelphia Phantoms players
Phoenix Coyotes players
Phoenix Roadrunners (IHL) players
San Antonio Rampage players
Sault Ste. Marie Greyhounds players
Springfield Falcons players
Canadian expatriate ice hockey players in Germany